Live at Bamboozle 2010 may refer to:

 Live at Bamboozle 2010 (Jonny Craig album)
 Live at Bamboozle 2010, a live album by Dance Gavin Dance